Richard A. Butler (2 December 1874 – 2 May 1952) was an Irish politician. He was an independent member of Seanad Éireann from 1922 to 1925 and from 1929 to 1931. He was first elected at the 1922 Seanad election and lost his seat at the 1925 Seanad election. He was re-elected to Seanad at a by-election on 23 October 1929, replacing Sir Nugent Everard. He was defeated at the 1931 Seanad election.

Richard Andrew Butler was born in Dublin. A leading local farmer and council member of the Royal Dublin Society he lived at Popeshall, Loughshinny near Skerries, County Dublin, and died in the Mater Misericordiae University Hospital, Dublin.

References

1874 births
1952 deaths
Independent members of Seanad Éireann
Irish farmers
Members of the 1922 Seanad
Members of the 1928 Seanad
Politicians from County Dublin